was an Okinawan martial arts master and founder of the Shōrin-ryū Kishaba Juku.

He was born October 4, 1929 in Okinawa and died in the year 2000.

Kishaba's younger brother Chogi Kishaba is also an Okinawan martial arts master.

Shōrin-ryū Kishaba Juku

Kishaba's senior student in Okinawa was Katsuhiko Shinzato who currently heads the Kishaba Juku.

Dojos affiliated to the Kishaba Juku are located in Germany, Japan, the United States, and Slovenia. Within the United States there are dojos in California, Connecticut, Florida, Hawaii, Massachusetts, Nebraska, New York, Oregon and Virginia.

See also 

Okinawan martial arts

References

Martial arts school founders
Okinawan male karateka
1929 births
2000 deaths
20th-century philanthropists
Shōrin-ryū practitioners